H. M. Ibrahim (এইচ এম ইব্রাহিম) is a Bangladesh Awami League politician and the incumbent Member of Parliament from Noakhali-1.

Early life
Ibrahim was born on 6 September 1958. He studied up to HSC.

Career
Ibrahim was defeated in the Noakhali-1 Parliamentary election by Bangladesh Nationalist Party Candidate Mahbubuddin Khokan on 13 January 2009. The election was held after Ganatantri Party president and AL-led alliance candidate Nurul Islam died in a fire 26 days before the election on 3 December 2008. He was elected to Parliament from Noakhali-1 in 2014 from Bangladesh Awami League.

References

Awami League politicians
Living people
10th Jatiya Sangsad members
11th Jatiya Sangsad members
Year of birth missing (living people)